Filip Rajevac (born 21 June 1992) is a Serbian football forward who plays for FK Loznica.

Career

Budućnost Valjevo
Born in Valjevo, Rajevac started his career in local club Budućnost. For 2 seasons, he played 36 matches in the Serbian League West and scored 5 goals.

Jedinstvo Ub
After Budućnost, Rajevac played for Jedinstvo Ub, in the first half of season 2011–12. He scored 8 goal on 15 matches playing for the team from Ub.

Jedinstvo Užice
Rajevac moved to the club with the same name, Jedinstvo Užice for the second half of 2011–12 season. He played 11 matches and scored 2 goal until the end of season. The club was also promoted in Serbian First League for the next season.

Krušik
Attacker returned in Valjevo, in football club of the "Krušik" industry in summer 2012. He made 14 appearances and scored 1 goal playing for FK Krušik Valjevo. After 6 months he left to FK Kolubara.

Kolubara
On 9 matches in the Serbian First League, he scored 2 goals, against Čukarički, and Napredak. After the end of 2012–13 season, he left FK Kolubara.

Železničar Lajkovac
In the 2013–14 season, Rajevac played for Železničar Lajkovac. He made 25 league appearances and scored 11 goals until the end of season.

Budućnost Krušik
After the merger of two Valjevo clubs, Budućnost, and Krušik, Rajevac returned to his home town and joined FK Budućnost Krušik 2014. Rajevac played all 15 fixtures, and was the best team scorer in the first half of 2014–15 season. He scored 4 goals against Pobeda Beloševac in 11th fixture, when he scored a spectacular goal from a bicycle kick, and also 1 from penalty. 2 goals scored against Bane in 2nd fixture, including 1 penalty, and against GFK Jasenica in 6th fixture, both from penalties. He also scored a goals against Jošanica in the 1st, Šumadija 1903 in 3rd, Jedinstvo Ub in 12th and Šumadija Aranđelovac in 14th fixture. He also played matches against Sloga Požega in 4th, Polet Ljubić in 5th, Karađorđe Topola in 7th, Zvižd in 8th, Rudar Kostolac in 9th, Loznica in 10th, Smederevo in 13th, and Železničar Lajkovac in the 15th, fixture of Serbian League West. He left the club after the first half of season.

Siarka Tarnobrzeg
Filip moved to Poland on the beginning of 2015, and joined Siarka Tarnobrzeg for 6 months. He debuted for his new team on the 8 March 2015, in a 3:1 loss against Znicz Pruszków. After that, he played 6 more matches until the end of season, but without goals.

OFK Beograd
After short abroad episode, Rajevac joined OFK Beograd in summer 2015, but due to administrative problems gained the right to play in 4th fixture of the Serbian SuperLiga.

Bunyodkor
On 23 January 2018, Bunyodkor announced the signing of Rajevac.

Lokomotiv Tashkent
Rajevas joined PFC Lokomotiv Tashkent on 1 January 2019.

Career statistics

Honours
Jedinstvo Užice
Serbian League West: 2011–12

References

External links
 
 

1992 births
Living people
Sportspeople from Valjevo
Association football forwards
Serbian footballers
Siarka Tarnobrzeg players
FK Budućnost Valjevo players
FK Jedinstvo Ub players
FK Jedinstvo Užice players
FK Kolubara players
FK Železničar Lajkovac players
OFK Beograd players
FC Bunyodkor players
PFC Lokomotiv Tashkent players
FK Inđija players
FK Budućnost Dobanovci players
FK Loznica players
Uzbekistan Super League players
Serbian SuperLiga players
Serbian expatriate sportspeople in Poland
Serbian expatriate sportspeople in Uzbekistan
Expatriate footballers in Poland
Expatriate footballers in Uzbekistan